Captain Hew Dalrymple (sometimes spelt Hugh; ca. 1740 – 1774) was a Scottish advocate and poet who served as Attorney General of Grenada.

His youngest daughter was the courtesan Grace Elliott.

Dalrymple graduated LLD in 1771. He was involved in the great Douglas case.

Works
  – an elegy for Charles Spencer, 3rd Duke of Marlborough (1706–1758) who commanded the Raid on St Malo in 1758
  – a defence of Scotland during the Bute administration

References

Further reading
 Eliott, Grace, in Journal of my Life (1859)
 Forster, Harold, Supplements to Dodsley's Collection of Poems (1980) 102
 Notes Queries 1st Series 9:589

1740s births
1774 deaths
Lawyers from Edinburgh
Members of the Faculty of Advocates
Scottish columnists
Scottish political writers
Scottish Presbyterians
Attorneys General of British Grenada
18th-century Scottish people
18th-century Scottish poets
Writers from Edinburgh